The 1911 Mississippi College Collegians football team represented Mississippi College as a member of the Southern Intercollegiate Athletic Association (SIAA) during the 1911 college football season.

Schedule

References

Mississippi College
Mississippi College Choctaws football seasons
Mississippi College Collegians football